Paul Alfredo Brown (born 15 January 1991) is a Caymanian footballer who plays as a defender. He represented the Cayman Islands three times at the 2010 Caribbean Championship, scoring two goals.

International career

References

External links
 

Association football defenders
Living people
1991 births
Caymanian footballers
Future SC players
Cayman Islands international footballers
Cayman Islands under-20 international footballers
Cayman Islands youth international footballers